The Guinean passport is issued to citizens of the Guinea for international travel.

Languages
The data page/information page is printed in French and English.

See also 
 List of passports
 Visa requirements for Guinean citizens

References

Passports by country
Government of Guinea